Fragiscutum is a genus of trilobites in the order Phacopida, that existed during the Silurian in what is now the United States. It was described by Whittington and Campbell in 1967, and the type species is Fragiscutum rhytium. The type locality was the Hardwood Mountain Formation in Maine.

References

External links
 Fragiscutum at the Paleobiology Database

Encrinuridae genera
Fossil taxa described in 1967
Silurian trilobites of North America
Extinct animals of the United States
Paleozoic life of the Northwest Territories